Hasshaku-sama is a Japanese urban legend that has become popular in recent years. The legend revolves around a mysterious, tall woman who is said to appear to people in rural areas of Japan. Her name, Hasshaku-sama, translates to "8-foot-tall woman."

Legend 
According to the legend, Hasshaku-sama appears to people who are walking alone on deserted roads, particularly in rural areas at night. She is described as having long black hair and wearing a white dress or kimono. Her height is said to be around eight feet tall, making her much taller than an average person.

It is believed that Hasshaku-sama targets people who are alone and vulnerable, such as children or women walking alone at night. She is said to approach her victims from behind, tapping them on the shoulder or calling out their names. Those who turn around to face her are said to be met with a horrifying sight - Hasshaku-sama's face is said to be distorted and terrifying.

According to the legend, those who encounter Hasshaku-sama are never the same. Some people report feeling ill or fainting after seeing her, while others claim to have been physically attacked by her. Some people even believe that those who encounter Hasshaku-sama are cursed and will suffer misfortune or illness in the future.

References 

2channel
Internet memes
Japanese urban legends
Internet culture